Lukas Hollaus (born 23 September 1986) is an Austrian triathlete. In 2021, he competed in the men's triathlon at the 2020 Summer Olympics held in Tokyo, Japan, finishing 34th. He was also scheduled to compete in the mixed relay event but the Austrian team did not start.

References

External links 
 

Living people
1986 births
Place of birth missing (living people)
Austrian male triathletes
Triathletes at the 2020 Summer Olympics
Olympic triathletes of Austria
21st-century Austrian people